Tommy Neill (3 October 1930 – 15 July 1996) was a Scottish footballer who played as a wing half in the Football League for Bolton Wanderers, Bury and Tranmere Rovers. He also spent one season at Wigan Athletic in the Cheshire League, playing 35 games and scoring five goals.

References

External links
 

Tranmere Rovers F.C. players
1930 births
1996 deaths
Scottish footballers
Bolton Wanderers F.C. players
English Football League players
Bury F.C. players
Wigan Athletic F.C. players
Association football wing halves
People from Methil
Footballers from Fife